Parinari costata is a species of plant in the family Chrysobalanaceae found in Indonesia, Malaysia, the Philippines, and Singapore. Besides those countries it can also be found in Thailand and on the islands such as Sumatra and Borneo.

Ecology

References

costata
Least concern plants
Taxonomy articles created by Polbot